Madukkarai is a suburb of Coimbatore city in the Indian state of Tamil Nadu. It is the gateway to Coimbatore city from Kerala State and is located around 12 km from the Kerala border. The Coimbatore International Airport is about 27 km from here. It is the administrative centre for Madukkarai taluk.

Etymology 
The name "Madukkarai" originated from the colloquial use of the words "Mathil" (means "great wall" in Tamil) + "Karai" (means "shore" in Tamil) as it is situated along the hill sides of the Western Ghats.

Geography 
It has an average elevation of 311 metres (1020 feet).

Demographics

 India census, Madukkarai had a population of 25,733. Males constitute 51% of the population and females 49%. Madukkarai has an average literacy rate of 72%, higher than the national average of 59.5%: male literacy is 79%, and female literacy is 64%. In Madukkarai, 10% of the population is under 6 years of age.

Industries

Madukkarai has one of the oldest cement plants in India, which belongs to ACC of the Holcim Group. This was built during the British days.

Transport

Madukkarai is on the main road connecting Coimbatore city to NH47, which bypasses the city. It includes the junction connecting towards the south-west which goes to Pallakad. Work on the 4-laning of the Madukkarai - Walayar stretch is in progress.
There is also a railway station which serves as an important goods shedding point, transporting stones and other raw materials for cement manufacture, and also transporting the cement produced. There is a railway line into the factory. Passenger trains from and to Palghat stop at Madukkarai station.

Medical Care

New Nalam Pharmacy in Madukkarai

Pharmacies: New Nalam Pharmacy, Vignesh Medicals, Shakthi Pharmacy.

Temples

Dharmalingeshwarar Temple whose main deity Shiva is located in the top of the hill in Madukkarai.
Arulmigu Bathirakali Amman Kovil, Gandhi Nagar, Madukkarai.
Sri Balavinayagar Gnanalingeshwarar Temple, Union Office, Gandhi Nagar, Madukkarai.
Kaliyugavaratha perumaal kovil, quarry office, madukkarai.

References

Cities and towns in Coimbatore district